Cacia andamanica is a species of beetle in the family Cerambycidae. It was described by Stephan von Breuning in 1935. It is known from the Andaman and Nicobar Islands.

References

Cacia (beetle)
Beetles described in 1935